Terri Lee Stickles (born May 11, 1946) is an American former competition swimmer, Olympic medalist, and former world record-holder.  She received a bronze medal for her third-place finish in the women's 400-meter freestyle event at the 1964 Summer Olympics in Tokyo, Japan.

She was a member of the Santa Clara Swim Club, notable for producing Olympic swimmers such as Donna de Varona and Mark Spitz.  She trained with swimming coach George Haines, who was noted for training future Olympic medalists during the 1960s and 1970s.

Her brother, Ted Stickles, was also a competition swimmer, set world records in the 200-meter and 400-meter individual medley events.

Stickles was married to Olympic long-distance runner Álvaro Mejía.  They met in Cali, Colombia, where she was a Peace Corps volunteer.  Stickles brought Mejía to the San Francisco Bay Area in 1969.  They subsequently divorced.

She is now retired and living in Calaveras County, California.  She is a fused glass artist.

See also
 List of Olympic medalists in swimming (women)
 World record progression 4 × 100 metres freestyle relay

References

External links
 

1946 births
Living people
American female freestyle swimmers
World record setters in swimming
Olympic bronze medalists for the United States in swimming
People from San Mateo, California
Swimmers at the 1963 Pan American Games
Swimmers at the 1964 Summer Olympics
Medalists at the 1964 Summer Olympics
Pan American Games gold medalists for the United States
Pan American Games silver medalists for the United States
People from Calaveras County, California
Pan American Games medalists in swimming
Medalists at the 1963 Pan American Games
21st-century American women